Janet Neel Cohen, Baroness Cohen of Pimlico (born 4 July 1940) is a British lawyer and crime fiction writer. She is the daughter of George Edric Neel and Mary Isabel Budge. She was educated at South Hampstead High School, Hampstead, London, England and graduated from Newnham College, Cambridge University in 1962 with a Bachelor of Arts (B.A.), Honours, Law.

She started to work as a practising solicitor in 1965. She married James Lionel Cohen, son of Dr. Richard Henry Lionel Cohen, on 18 December 1971. She was a Governor of the BBC between 1994 and 1999. She was created a life peer as Baroness Cohen of Pimlico, of Pimlico in the City of Westminster on 3 May 2000 and sits as a Labour peer in the House of Lords. She is an Honorary Fellow of St Edmund's College, Cambridge.

As Janet Neel and Janet Cohen she is the author of crime fiction novels.

Bibliography

Francesca Wilson and John McLeish series
Death's Bright Angel (1988)
Death on Site (1989)
Death of a Partner (1991), shortlisted for Gold Dagger Award
Death Among the Dons (1993), shortlisted for Gold Dagger Award
A Timely Death (1996)
To Die For (1998)
O Gentle Death (2000)

Other novels
The Highest Bidder (1992); writing as Janet Cohen
Children of a Harsh Winter (1995); writing as Janet Cohen
Ticket to Ride (2005)

References 

1940 births
Alumni of Newnham College, Cambridge
BBC Governors
English crime fiction writers
Life peeresses created by Elizabeth II
Members of the Detection Club
Living people
People educated at South Hampstead High School
Labour Party (UK) life peers
English women novelists
20th-century English women writers
20th-century English writers
21st-century English women writers
Women mystery writers